

Mainline highways

Business routes

See also

References

External links
New Mexico Highways

 
Interstate